The Alice B. Toklas LGBT Democratic Club (first known as The Alice B. Toklas Memorial Democratic Club) is a San Francisco-based association and political action committee for lesbian, gay, bisexual, and transgender (LGBT) Democrats.

The political club is currently active in its endorsement of Democratic candidates in the San Francisco area.

History
Founded in 1971 by activists Del Martin and Phyllis Lyon, Beth Elliott, and Jim Foster, it was the first organization for gay Democrats in the United States. It is named after lesbian writer and San Francisco native Alice B. Toklas. The club has been known for its more moderate approach and in 1976, local LGBT activists broke off to form the more progressive Harvey Milk Lesbian, Gay, Bisexual, Transgender Democratic Club.

The club hosts an annual breakfast during Pride. In 2016, the event was attended by more than 800 people and was addressed by House Minority Leader Nancy Pelosi, several members of Congress, and several state and local elected leaders.

See also
National Stonewall Democrats

References

External links
Official Alice B. Toklas LGBT Democratic Club website

LGBT liberalism
LGBT political advocacy groups in California
Organizations based in San Francisco
California Democratic Party
LGBT affiliate organizations of political parties
LGBT history in San Francisco
Organizations established in 1971
1971 establishments in California
Democratic Party (United States) organizations
1971 in LGBT history